Carola Lotti (1907–1990) was an Italian actress. She was the elder sister of the actress Mariella Lotti.

Selected filmography
 Rails by Mario Camerini (1929)
 The Man with the Claw by Nunzio Malasomma (1931)
 What Scoundrels Men Are! by Mario Camerini (1932)
 But It's Nothing Serious by Mario Camerini (1936)
 Jeanne Dorè by Mario Bonnard (1938)
 Father For a Night by Mario Bonnard (1939)
 Il ponte dei sospiri by Mario Bonnard (1940)
 Redenzione by di Marcello Albani (1943)
 Gran premio by Umberto Scarpelli and Giuseppe Musso (1944)

References

Bibliography
 Giorgio Bertellini. The Cinema of Italy. Wallflower Press, 2004.

External links

1910 births
1990 deaths
Italian film actresses